Barbara Jean Paulson (née Lewis; born April 11, 1928) was an American human computer at NASA's Jet Propulsion Laboratory (JPL) and one of the first female scientists employed there. Paulson began working as a mathematician at JPL in 1948, where she calculated rocket trajectories by hand. She is among the women who made early progress at JPL.

Early life 
Paulson was born in Columbus, Ohio on April 11, 1928. She was raised with three siblings 
(two older sisters and one younger brother), and when she was 12 years old her father died. Beginning in 9th grade, Paulson took four years of Latin and math while her sisters took short hand as Paulson did not want to be a secretary. After attending Ohio State University for one year, Paulson's sister, who was already working in Pasadena at the time, convinced her mother to move to Pasadena as well. In 1947 the family moved to Pasadena, California, where her career at JPL would begin.

In 1959 Barbara married Harry Murray Paulson in Pasadena where they lived until 1962 before moving to Monrovia. In 1975 they finally settled in Glendora.

Career 
Paulson joined the Jet Propulsion Laboratory in 1948 as a computer, calculating rocket paths and working on the MGM-5 Corporal, the first guided missile designed by the United States to carry a nuclear warhead. Paulson and her colleagues were at one point invited to sign their names on the 100th Corporal rocket prior to its transport to the White Sands test range. The rocket exploded shortly after liftoff. On January 31, 1958., Paulson was assigned to the operations center for Explorer-1, the first satellite of the United States, launched during the Space Race with the Soviet Union. Paulson did the work with minimal equipment: a mechanical pencil, light table, and graph paper. The multi-stage launch that Paulson aided in calculations for allowed the Corporal could carry a warhead over 200 miles.

In 1960, when Paulson was 32 years old, her husband Harry were expecting their first child. When Paulson requested a closer parking space at work because she was pregnant, she was forced to quit as JPL did not employ pregnant women at the time and keeping a pregnant women on staff would result in insurance policy problems. JPL had no maternity leave, so women who were fired or forced to quit their positions did not have jobs to return to after giving birth. Paulson's supervisor, Helen Ling, worked hard to rehire women who'd been forced out with no parental leave, so in 1961, when her daughter was seven months old, Paulson accepted Ling's offer and returned to the lab. Paulson notably did not apply for a better parking spot when she got pregnant for the second time. At one point during Paulson's early years at JPL a beauty contest was held amongst the other female human computers. Paulson came in third place and the queen of the contest was called 'Miss Guided Missile'.

In the 1960s, with JPL's reputation cemented in the success of Explorer-1, JPL began to set its sights on the moon and other interplanetary exploration missions. Paulson and her colleague Helen Ling worked overtime to calculate trajectories of the Mariner probes that would later be sent to Venus and Mars. Paulson and her colleagues determined that only brief timeframes and launch opportunities existed that allowed for the ideal transit from Earth to its target. In the late 1960s Paulson was given title of engineer and eventually became a supervisor in the lab.

In the 1970s Paulson later went on to play a vital role in the Viking program, the first lander to reach the surface of mars. Paulson successfully calculated the trajectory the Viking probe needed on its 11-month transit between Earth and Mars. Paulson's calculations also proved to be essential during the entry, descent, and landing (EDL) phase of the mission in which the lander would detach from the spacecraft, enter the martian atmosphere, and parachute down to the surface. In the late 1970s Paulson and her colleagues worked on some of the first interstellar trajectories during the planning of the Voyager missions in which Voyager 1, having launched in September 1977, and as of April 13, 2019 is the most distant from Earth of all human-made objects.

Paulson retired from JPL in 1993 and remained in Pasadena until 2003 before moving to Iowa.

Personal life 
Paulson and her husband Harry had daughters Karen (née Paulson) Bishop and Kathleen (née Paulson) Knutson, four grandchildren (Jonathan, Kyle, Harrison, and Corrine), and several nieces and nephews.  Throughout pregnancy and her eventual return to work at JPL, Barbara's husband at the time was a real estate appraiser and member of the Pasadena Board of Realtors. Fortunately, upon Barbara's return to work Harry was able to adjust his schedule, as did many of the other human computers with children, to ensure that their children were taken care of.

Barbara Paulson's husband Harry Murray Paulson passed away on July 9, 2003, they were married 44 years. In 2003, Paulson sold her home following her husband's death, and moved to Iowa to be closer to her daughters and their families.

Recognition and legacy 

In 1959 Paulson was recognized and received her 10-year pin for her work at the Jet Propulsion Laboratory. Paulson would work at the Jet Propulsion Laboratory for 45 years, and retire in 1993. In 2016, Nathalia Holt wrote Rise of the Rocket Girls, a book about Paulson and other women who were early employees at NASA.

References 

Human computers
1928 births
Living people
NASA people
American women mathematicians
21st-century American women